The FIA European Hill Climb Championship (FIA EHC) is an FIA-run motorsport competition held across Europe on closed public road courses.

Unlike circuit racing, each driver competes alone, starting from a point at the base of a mountain and reaching a finish point near the summit. The European Championship allows single-seater cars, open-cockpit sports prototypes, and touring cars with varying degrees of technical preparation.

2021 Calendar

Groups and classes since 2020 
Since 2020 - Performance Factor

European Hill Climb Champions 1957–2019 

For the two categories, the FIA awards the titles:
 European Hill Climb Champion for Production Cars
 European Hill Climb Champion for Competition Cars

Additionally, the first driver of the first group to which the European Champion does not belong, will be declared:
 Winner of the FIA Hill Climb Trophy for Production Cars
 Winner of the FIA Hill Climb Trophy for Competition Cars

1930s
The first European Hill Climbing Championship was contested between 1930 and 1933, under the aegis of the Association Internationale des Automobile Clubs Reconnus (AIACR), the predecessor of the FIA.

See also

 FIA International Hill Climb Cup
 FIA Hill Climb Masters
 Hillclimbing
 Mont Ventoux Hill Climb

References

External links
 News and results of Hill Climbing
  – website about Czech and European hill climbs
  – Most complete European Hill Climb Championship race results 1957-today by ing. Roman Krejčí
 Hill Climb Winners 1897–1949

Hillclimbing series
Hill climb
Recurring sporting events established in 1930